Aleksandrov Peak is the mostly ice-covered peak of elevation 2148 m in the west foothills of Bruce Plateau on Loubet Coast in Graham Land, Antarctica.  It has rounded top and steep, partly ice-free south, west and north slopes, and surmounts Erskine Glacier to the south and west, and its tributary Byway Glacier to the southeast.

The peak is named after Todor Aleksandrov (1881–1924), a leader of the Bulgarian liberation movement in Macedonia.

Location
British mapping in 1976.

Maps
 Antarctic Digital Database (ADD). Scale 1:250000 topographic map of Antarctica. Scientific Committee on Antarctic Research (SCAR). Since 1993, regularly upgraded and updated.
British Antarctic Territory. Scale 1:200000 topographic map. DOS 610 Series, Sheet W 66 64. Directorate of Overseas Surveys, Tolworth, UK, 1976.

Notes

References
 Bulgarian Antarctic Gazetteer. Antarctic Place-names Commission. (details in Bulgarian, basic data in English)
Aleksandrov Peak. SCAR Composite Antarctic Gazetteer.

External links
 Aleksandrov Peak. Copernix satellite image

Mountains of Graham Land
Bulgaria and the Antarctic
Loubet Coast